Zosteropoda is a genus of moths of the family Noctuidae.

Species
 Zosteropoda clementei Meadows, 1942
 Zosteropoda elevata Draudt, 1924
 Zosteropoda hirtipes Grote, 1874

References
Natural History Museum Lepidoptera genus database
Zosteropoda at funet

Hadeninae